Marchaevo, or Marčaevo, is a village located in the Vitosha municipality in the southern parts of the capital Sofia.  it has 1,308 inhabitants.

Villages in Sofia City Province